Tavlash is a rural locality (a village) in Nikolskoye Rural Settlement, Ust-Kubinsky District, Vologda Oblast, Russia. The population was 10 as of 2002.

Geography 
Tavlash is located 40 km northwest of Ustye (the district's administrative centre) by road. Bor is the nearest rural locality.

References 

Rural localities in Ust-Kubinsky District